Brickton is a community in the Canadian province of Nova Scotia, located in Annapolis County. It is on Nova Scotia Trunk 1.

References

Communities in Annapolis County, Nova Scotia
General Service Areas in Nova Scotia